Eugenia McKenzie Bacon (1853-1933) was an American suffragist and advocate for public libraries in Illinois.

Life
Bacon née McKenzie was born on October 4, 1853, in Bowling Green, Indiana. In 1874, she married George R. Bacon (1845–1911) with whom she had one child who died at the age of eight. Immediately following their wedding Eugenia and George Bacon traveled across the United States on the newly opened Central Pacific Railway to San Francisco, and then by ocean vessel to Portland Oregon by river to Camp Harney.  After three years Eugenia became severely ill while George Bacon was away on an expedition and returned to Illinois for medical treatment. Her husband soon resigned his army position to join her. 

Bacon was a suffragist, advocating for women's rights at the Illinois state legislature. She also authored suffragist pamphlets.

Bacon was active in the Illinois Federation of Women's Clubs (IFWC). She was an officer of the Decatur Women's Club for ten years (five years as president), then serving for two terms as the State Secretary for Illinois at the General Federation of Women's Clubs. As part of her work for the IFWC Bacon was on the Library Extension Commission, working to establish public libraries in Illinois. The Illinois Library Extension Commission consisted of James A. Rose, Joseph Freeman, and Bacon who served as Secretary of the Board.

Bacon was also the Illinois editor for The Club Woman publication.

Bacon died on December 10, 1933, in Decatur, Illinois.

See also
 List of suffragists and suffragettes

References

External links
 

1853 births 
1933 deaths
American suffragists
People from Clay County, Indiana
People from Decatur, Illinois
Activists from Illinois
Clubwomen
American women editors
Pamphleteers